Ali Abbas Zafar is an Indian film director, producer and screenwriter. He is known for directing Mere Brother Ki Dulhan (2011), Gunday (2014), Sultan (2016), Tiger Zinda Hai (2017) and Bharat (2019).

Personal life 
Zafar is a graduate of Kirori Mal College, New Delhi. He married Alicia Zafar, an Iranian based in France, on 4 January 2021.

Career
Zafar entered the film industry as an assistant director, with multiple projects for the production company Yash Raj Films (YRF). He then made his own directorial and screen-writing debut with the romantic comedy Mere Brother Ki Dulhan (2011). The film revolved around a young man (Imran Khan) who finds a bride (Katrina Kaif) for his elder brother (Ali Zafar), but then finds that he himself has fallen in love with her.

His next film was the action drama Gunday (2014), set in Calcutta in the 1970s and 1980s. The film starred Ranveer Singh and Arjun Kapoor as powerful bandits, Priyanka Chopra as a cabaret dancer whom they both fall in love with, and Irrfan Khan as a police officer pursuing them. Gunday received mostly positive reviews from critics.

Zafar's next film was the blockbuster sports drama Sultan (2016) starring Salman Khan as a wrestling champion from Haryana, with Anushka Sharma as a female wrestler who becomes a love interest for Khan's character. The film received positive reviews from critics and has emerged as one of the highest-grossing Indian films.

His next film is the action thriller Tiger Zinda Hai (2017) the sequel to YRF's Ek Tha Tiger (2012). The film stars Salman Khan as a RAW agent and Katrina Kaif as an ISI spy reprising their roles from the first film and is about the both of them accepting a rescue mission to free 40 nurses, 25 Indian and 15 Pakistani, from a ruthless militant. The film released in December 2017 and received generally positive reviews from critics, and became a major commercial success emerging as the highest-grossing films of the year and one of the highest-grossing Indian films.

In May 2018, he began pre-production of the film Bharat, which is slated to be released on Eid, 2019. The trailer of this film was released on 22 April 2019 It stars Salman Khan, Katrina Kaif, Disha Patani, Sunil Grover and Tabu (actress), and is an official adaptation of the Korean film, Ode to My Father. It marks the third collaboration between Khan and Ali.

In 2020, Zafar made his debut as the producer for Khaali Peeli, an action-comedy directed by debutante Maqbool Khan that starred Ishaan Khatter and Ananya Pandey in lead roles.

Zafar's first web series Tandav, which is a political drama that stars Saif Ali Khan who will be portraying the role of a powerful politician will be streaming by 15 January 2021 on Amazon Prime Video. This 9-episode series will also star Dimple Kapadia, Sunil Grover, Kumud Misra, Tigmanshu Dhulia, Mohammed Zeeshan Ayyub, Gauahar Khan, Sarah Jane Dias, Kritika Kamra, Dino Morea, Sandhya Mridul, Amyra Dastur, and Anup Soni. He has also announced Bade Miyan Chote Miyan with Akshay Kumar and Tiger Shroff, which will be produced by Jackky Bhagnani under Pooja Entertainment. It is intended to release in Christmas of 2023.

Filmography

As director

As assistant director

Awards and nominations

References

External links
 

Living people
Hindi-language film directors
Artists from Dehradun
Delhi University alumni
Indian male screenwriters
Film directors from Uttarakhand
20th-century Indian film directors
Year of birth missing (living people)